Ali Mbaé Camara is a Comorian professional football player and football manager. From 2006 to 2007 and from October 2011 to December 2013 he coached Comoros national football team.

References

External links 

1970 births
Living people
Comorian footballers
RC Lens players
Comorian football managers
Comoros national football team managers
Place of birth missing (living people)
Association football midfielders